The  was held on 31 January 1987 in Kannai Hall, Yokohama, Kanagawa, Japan.

Awards
 Best Film: Uhohho tankentai
 Best New Actor: Tōru Nakamura – Be-Bop High School, Be Bop Highschool: Koko Yotaro Elegy
 Best Actor: Koichi Iwaki – Minami e Hashire, Umi no Michi o!
 Best Actress: Narumi Yasuda – Minami e Hashire, Umi no Michi o!, Inujini Sesi Mono, Sorobanzuku
 Best New Actress:
Miki Imai – Inujini Seshi Mono
Kiwako Harada – His Motorbike, Her Island
 Best Supporting Actor: Kaoru Kobayashi – Sorobanzuku
 Best Supporting Actress: Noriko Watanabe – His Motorbike, Her Island
 Best Director: Hiroyuki Nasu – Be-Bop High School, Be Bop Highschool: Koko Yotaro Elegy
 Best New Director: Kaizo Hayashi – Yume Miruyōni Nemuritai
 Best Screenplay: Yoshimitsu Morita – Uhohho Tankentai, Sorobanzuku
 Best Cinematography: Yasushi Sasakibara – Minami e Hashire, Umi no Michi o!, Saya no Iru Tōshizu
 Best Independent Film: Yume Miruyōni Nemuritai
 Special Jury Prize: Saya no Iru Tōshizu – For the staff.
 Special Prize: Kihachi Okamoto (Career)

Best 10
 Uhohho Tankentai
 Comic Magazine
 His Motorbike, Her Island
 Yuki no Danshō: Jōnetsu
 Inujini Seshi Mono
 Be-Bop High School
 Saya no Iru Tōshizu
 Castle in the Sky
 Jazz Daimyō
 Sorobanzuku
runner-up. House on Fire

References

Yokohama Film Festival
Yokohama Film Festival
Yokohama Film Festival
Yokohama Film Festival